James Saunders (27 May 1802 – 27 March 1832) was an English cricketer in the 1820s. He was a left-handed batsman and an occasional wicket-keeper who represented many different teams from 1822 to 1831. In county cricket, he played for Sussex (1823–1825), Kent (1827) and Surrey (1828–1830). He belonged to a cricketing family as his cousins were Richard Searle and his better known brother William Searle.

Saunders was born and lived his whole life in Haslemere, Surrey, where he was a butcher. He was about 5'11" tall and weighed around 12 st. He died aged 29 of consumption and had to stop playing cricket in 1831, a year before his death. According to Scores and Biographies, he was a "showy" batsman whose favourite shot was the square cut.

Saunders made his known debut in the 1822 season and appeared in 54 known matches to the 1831 season. He scored 2,180 career runs at a batting average of 24.22 with a highest score of 100. He rarely bowled but he did take two wickets.

References

1802 births
1832 deaths
English cricketers of 1787 to 1825
English cricketers of 1826 to 1863
English cricketers
Godalming Cricket Club cricketers
Kent cricketers
Left-Handed v Right-Handed cricketers
Married v Single cricketers
Marylebone Cricket Club cricketers
Non-international England cricketers
People from Haslemere
Players cricketers
Surrey cricketers
Sussex cricketers
19th-century deaths from tuberculosis
Tuberculosis deaths in England